Alan Robert Jackson       (30 March 1936 – 4 August 2018) was an Australian businessman who was the Director of BTR Nylex between 1984 and 1996 and CEO of BTR plc between 1991 and 1996 as well as Chairman of the Australian Trade Commission (Austrade) between 1995 and 2001. He was also a board member and a Director of the Reserve Bank of Australia between 1991 and 2001.

Personal life and education 
Jackson was born in Drouin, Victoria but grew up in Bunyip, in the Western part of the Gippsland during the Great Depression. His father was James Jackson and his mother was Doris Lane. Jackson had two siblings.

His family are descendants of early European explorers in Victoria, including Joseph Henry Jackson who, in the 1850s, founded modern-day Jindivick by carving out a track which he named ‘Jackson's Track’ in the North-Western Gippsland area in the Baw Baw Shire.

In 1952, when he was 15, Jackson left Warragul High School and trained to became a pastry cook but became an office boy or clerk in Melbourne. At 19, he took accountancy studies by correspondence at Hemmingway Robertson Institute. He did not complete his High School Certificate (HSC), but did a brief management course at Harvard's Business School in 1977.

He married Esme Adelia Jackson (née Giles) on 20 January 1962. They had four daughters together. They were married, for 56 years, until his death in 2018. Jackson was a fellow of various chartered organisations that are predominantly in the accounting and managing fields. He was also a member of the Australian Club and the Commonwealth Golf Club in Melbourne.

Jackson was an active contributor to the Economic Planning Advisory Council between 1987 and 1990. This Advisory Council was initiated in 1983 by the Hawke government, that aimed to solve economic and social issues in the business and financial sectors of the Australian economy through providing advice to the government. This was later dissolved by the Howard government in 1998.

Career

Accounting  
Jackson began his career as a pastry chef but once he was old enough, he became an office boy at Kelly and Lewis Pty Ltd in 1955, but soon moved to Mather and Platt, in which he became a clerk. Mather and Platt was the Australian arm of a British pump manufacturer. After his studies, he progressed to become an accountant then, chief accountant and later finance secretary and finance director. He became managing director of the company during the 1970s, until 1977.

Period at BTR and subsidiaries  
Jackson became Managing Director of Hopkins Odlum between 1977 and 1990. This was a struggling industrial belting and products maker, which was controlled by BTR plc. In 1984, BTR Hopkins purchased Nylex Corporation Limited, a failing plastics manufacturer in Australia that was turned around by Jackson's "spartan" methods. A few years later in 1988, the original owner of Nylex, the Australian Consolidated Industries International Limited (ACI) was bought by BTR Nylex, following the transformation of Nylex and after the consequences of the 1988 stock market crash affected ACI negatively. As a result, ACI became a subsidiary of BTR Nylex. What Jackson did in this turn around of Nylex was one that provided large profits for the parent company, BTR. The way in which this was achieved was through rapid growth plans. This included substantial acquisitions, ruthless cost-cutting and strict financial reporting and profit planning systems. Jackson was asked about his methods in 1989 and reflected that, "When we take over a company I work my butt off, that's my absolute responsibility. People in our company don't survive unless they're bloody hard workers, and that includes me". Once the takeover occurred, Jackson also became the Director of Nylex Australia. As manager in Australia, he also acquired the China General Plastics Corporation of Taiwan and Feltrax of New Zealand. In late 1990, the Chairman of BTR plc, Sir Owen Green promoted him to head the company and its subsidiaries in London as its CEO.

Jackson became Managing Director and Chief Executive Officer of the BTR plc conglomerate, headed in London between 1991 and 1996. The BTR leadership team asked Jackson to lead the company due to the "stagnant" growth in profits at BTR and his successes in Australia. After nine months of leading the company, Jackson undertook a symbolic $2.9 billion hostile takeover of Hawker Siddeley. In 1991, Jackson completed the acquisition of ACI of Australia, one of the largest conglomerates in Australia and the largest hostile takeover in Australian history at that point in time. During this period, Jackson remained as Director of Nylex (Malaysia) and also the China Domestic Plastics Corporation. Jackson's ways in turning around Nylex in Australia, were also applied to BTR and its subsidiaries. By 1993, BTR controlled over 1,500 subsidiary companies in over 60 countries. During his time as BTR CEO, Jackson was feared by established business and was often referred to as "knuckles". In the course of his tenure, Jackson turned the profits of the company from $16.4 million to $764 million and sales grew from $115 million to $4.8 billion by 1995. Three years into his leadership of BTR, stocks had increased by 40%. In 1992, the company experienced the highest profits in over 70 years. However, Jackson was also known for investing in industrial manufacturing in the emerging markets of South East Asia and China, where he aimed at selling off the distribution businesses of BTR and invest that money in purchasing companies in Taiwan and Malaysia. While CEO of BTR and Nylex in 1995, Jackson completed the full takeover of Nylex. The remaining 37% of the company that BTR did not own, was to be purchased. Jackson bought it for $4.48 billion. In that same year, Nylex was estimated to be worth $11.8 billion, mostly due to Jackson’s methods of rapid growth. The mindset of Jackson is shown in a 1993 interview, when asked about his successes, he responded by saying, "A lot of my success is not from ambition but from fear of failure. And I've worked doubly hard to be certain that wouldn't occur". Jackson left the office of CEO at BTR in February 1996, but remained on the board of BTR for a number of years afterwards.

Later career  
In August 1995, Jackson was asked by the Australian Minster for Trade, Bob McMullan, to be a member of the board of the Australian Trade Commission (Austrade). He was invited by the board and by Tim Fischer in late 1995, to Chair the Commission. He served in this role for six years until July, 2001. Jackson was an early supporter of developing economic connections with Mainland China after opening to western trade in the 1980s. He furthered economic ties with Japan and South East Asian countries as well as reinforcing economic connections with the United Kingdom and the United States on behalf of Australia. 

He also became a non executive Director of Kerry Stokes's Seven Network after moving from BTR in 1995 until April, 2001. In the early 1990s, Jackson joined the board of Cabrini Hospital in Malvern East. He remained in this role for nearly a decade. In 2001, he also resigned from his board position as a Director at the Reserve Bank of Australia after ten years of service.

Throughout 2001, Jackson resigned from almost all of his leadership roles and responsibilities due to health reasons. He also resigned as Chairman of Nylex, which had previously been Austrim. However, BTR sold Nylex to Jackson's Austrim company in 1998. This support of Austrim was backed by investors, Kerry Stokes and Richard Pratt. Austrim was renamed to Austrim Nylex and later simplified to just Nylex. He chaired this company independently of BTR for three years following the collapse of BTR in 1999.

Retirement 
After leaving BTR as CEO in February 1996, Jackson returned to Australia and founded Cartagen Group Pty Ltd by developing land in Drouin, through his company. The Baw Baw Vista Estate began in the early 1990s with over 100 blocks initially sold. This was the predecessor of The Jackson's View Estate which was run by his wife and four daughters from 2010. In this new development, the Jackson family sold over 500 blocks. Cartagen was fully closed down by the family in 2020, after all property and business portfolios were sold off.

In 2002, Jackson was diagnosed with dementia. In 2018, he died peacefully at his home in Malvern East. He was buried at Cheltenham Memorial Cemetery in Cheltenham, Melbourne. In his obituary, he was called a “…true legend in business”.

Honours, awards and memberships 
 1970s: Fellow of the Institute of Chartered Accountants in Australia (FCA)
 1970s: Fellow of the Australian Society of Accountants (AASA), (FCPA)
 1970s: Fellow of the Australian Institute of Management (FAIM)
 1980s: Member of the Australian Club
 1980s: Member of the Commonwealth Golf Club
 1985: BRWs Businessman of the Year in Australia Award
 1987, 1988 & 1990: Recipient of Australia’s Best Enterprise Award
 1989: Recipient of Australia’s Best Acquisition Award
 1989: Australian Business Magazines Australian Businessman of the Year Award
 1990s: Companion of the British Institute of Management (CBIM)
 1990s: Member of the Mark's Club
 1990: Advance Australia Award for Service to Industry
 1991: Officer of the Order of Australia (AO), 26 January 1991, "For service to business, to industry and to government"
 1993: Recipient of Britain’s Best Managed Company Award
 1993: Fortunes European CEO of the Year Award
 1997: Monash Mount Eliza Business School Network Leadership Award
 2001: Centenary Medal, 1 January 2001, "For outstanding service to Australia's international trade"

References 

1936 births
2018 deaths
Deaths from dementia
Australian accountants
20th-century industrialists
21st-century industrialists
Businesspeople from Melbourne
Australian business executives
Australian corporate directors
20th-century Australian businesspeople
21st-century Australian businesspeople
Officers of the Order of Australia
Recipients of the Centenary Medal